Anton Viktorich Klykov is a Russian former competitive figure skater. He is the 2000 Nebelhorn Trophy champion. He was coached by Rafael Arutyunyan.

Results

References 

Russian male single skaters
Living people
Figure skaters from Moscow
Year of birth missing (living people)